Jason DeRose is the Western Bureau Chief for National Public Radio News, based at NPR's  west coast studios in Culver City, California. He edits news coverage by staff correspondents and from member station reporters and freelancers on the West Coast, as well as Alaska and Hawaii. Additionally, he oversees NPR's coverage of religion, LGBTQ+ rights, and Native/Indigenous rights.

Prior to this position, he was a Supervising Editor on National Public Radio's Business Desk and was an editor on the NPR program Day to Day until that program ended in March 2009. He has reported on religion, ethics, and spirituality for National Public Radio (NPR). His reports are heard on Morning Edition, All Things Considered, Day to Day, and Weekend Edition.

Recurrent themes in his reporting include: religious liberty and religious freedom, Islam in America; discrimination against Muslims since the September 11, 2001 attacks; sexuality as a defining issue for Christian denominations; LGBTQ+ clergy; and the impact on religious communities of land use policy, zoning, and eminent domain. Jason is a regular contributor to the ELCA worship resource "Sundays and Seasons," adding phrases such as "a cloud of witnesses who smuggle Christ into the world" and adding prayers for "blue whales and honey bees."

Prior to his current posting at NPR West, DeRose worked at NPR's headquarters in Washington, D.C. He spent a decade as a reporter then editor at WBEZ in Chicago, Illinois. DeRose did stints at NPR member stations in Seattle, Washington,  Minneapolis, Minnesota, and Tampa, Florida.

DeRose served on the board of directors of the Religion Newswriters Association, and as a mentor and trainer for NPR's Next Generation Radio Project — a program that teaches aspiring high school and college students public radio's unique reporting style. He is currently a board member of Holden Village, a Lutheran retreat and renewal center in Washington state.

DeRose has worked at the United States Holocaust Memorial Museum as an oral history interviewer and the International Center for Journalists as a trainer. He has also taught in the Religious Studies Department at DePaul University in Chicago and at Northwestern University's Medill School of Journalism.

DeRose graduated magna cum laude, Phi Beta Kappa from St. Olaf College in Northfield, Minnesota with majors in religion and English. He also holds a master's degree from the University of Chicago Divinity School and studied religion reporting at Northwestern University's Medill School of Journalism.

Sources and external links
Jason DeRose — National Public Radio website 
Jason DeRose — Knight Digital Media Center website
RNA Board of Directors — Religion Newswriters Association website
International Center for Journalists

People from Chicago
People from Santa Monica, California
Living people
American public radio personalities
Place of birth missing (living people)
Year of birth missing (living people)
St. Olaf College alumni
University of Chicago alumni
DePaul University faculty
Northwestern University faculty
Medill School of Journalism alumni
Journalists from California